The Tian Han Grand Theatre is a theatre on West Laodong Road in Tianxin District of Changsha, Hunan, China.  The theater, named after the pioneering Chinese playwright Tian Han, comprises the Great Theater, Concert Hall, Tian Han Memorial Hall, Art Gallery and the Masses Culture Plaza.

References

External links

Buildings and structures in Changsha
Theatres in Changsha
Tianxin District